Dietrich Dörner (born 28 September 1938, Berlin) is emeritus professor for General and Theoretical Psychology at the Institute of Theoretical Psychology at the Otto-Friedrich University in Bamberg, Germany.

In 1986, he received the Gottfried Wilhelm Leibniz Prize of the Deutsche Forschungsgemeinschaft, which is the highest honour awarded in German research.

The cognitive architecture Psi-Theory is developed under his guidance.

Books
The Logic of Failure: Recognizing And Avoiding Error In Complex Situations (1996, Perseus Publishing)
Bauplan für eine Seele (lit.: Blueprint for a Soul, available in German language only), Reinbek: Rowohlt, 2001.  
Die Mechanik des Seelenwagens (lit: Mechanics of the soul's cart, available in German language only), Bern: Huber, 2002.

References

External links
 Dietrich Dörner at the Otto-Friedrich-Universität Bamberg.

1938 births
Living people
German psychologists
Academic staff of the University of Bamberg
Gottfried Wilhelm Leibniz Prize winners